The following is a list of FCC-licensed radio stations in the U.S. state of Ohio, which can be sorted by their call signs, frequencies, cities of license, licensees, and programming formats.

List of radio stations

1 Operating under a "Shared Time" agreement on the same frequency.

Defunct
 KDPM Cleveland (1921–1927)
 W45CM/WELD Columbus (1941–1953)
 WAQI/WAST Ashtabula (1964–1982)
 WBKC/WCDN/WATJ Chardon (1969–2004)
 WBBY-FM Westerville (1969–1990)
 WBOE Cleveland (1938–1978)
 WAND/WCNS/WNYN/WTOF/WBXT/WCER Canton (1947–2011)
 WCLW Mansfield (1957–1987)
 WCRX-LP Columbus (2007–2020)

 WDBK/WFJC Cleveland; moved to Akron in 1927 (1924–1930)
 WFRO Fremont (1950–2021)
 WJDD Carrollton (surrendered in 2022)
 WJEH/WGTR/WJEH Gallipolis (1950–2021)
 WJTB North Ridgeville (1984–2017)
 WKNT/WJMP Kent (1965–2016)
 WJVS Cincinnati (surrendered in 2012)
 WLBJ-LP Fostoria (2015–2020)
 WLMH Morrow (cancelled in 2012)
 WLQR Toledo (1954–2016)

 WMH Cincinnati (1921–1923)
 WNSD Cincinnati (1972–1978)
 WHBD/WPAY Bellefountaine; moved to Mt. Orab in 1929 and Portsmouth in 1935 (1925–2011)

 WWGH-LP
WWIZ Lorain (1958–1967)

References

 
Radio stations
Ohio